Carlos Alcaraz is the defending champion. 

Alcaraz must defend the title in order to retain the ATP No. 1 ranking. Otherwise, he will lose the top ranking to Novak Djokovic, who was unable to enter the United States due to being unvaccinated for COVID-19.

Seeds
All seeds received a bye into the second round.

Draw

Finals

Top half

Section 1

Section 2

Section 3

Section 4

Bottom half

Section 5

Section 6

Section 7

Section 8

Seeded players
The following are the seeded players. Seedings are based on ATP rankings as of March 20, 2023. Rankings and points before are as of March 20, 2023.

† The player did not qualify for the main draw in 2023. Points from his 19th best result will be deducted instead.

Withdrawn players
The following players would have been seeded, but withdrew before the tournament began.

Other entry information

Wildcards

Protected ranking

Withdrawals 
 Before the tournament

Qualifying

Seeds

Qualifiers

Lucky losers

Qualifying draw

First qualifier

Second qualifier

Third qualifier

Fourth qualifier

Fifth qualifier

Sixth qualifier

Seventh qualifier

Eighth qualifier

Ninth qualifier

Tenth qualifier

Eleventh qualifier

Twelfth qualifier

References

External links
 Main draw
 Qualifying draw

Miami Open – Men's singles
Singles men